Kate Surman (born 28 October 1991) is an Australian rules footballer playing for Geelong in the AFL Women's (AFLW). She previously played for Gold Coast and Port Adelaide

Surman signed with Gold Coast during the first period of the 2019 expansion club signing period in July. She made her debut against  at Blacktown ISP Oval in the opening round of the 2020 season.

In June 2022, Surman was traded to Port Adelaide.

In March 2023, Surman was traded to Geelong in exchange for Maddy Keryk and pick #12.

Statistics 
Statistics are correct to the end of the 2020 season.

|- style="background-color:#EAEAEA"
! scope="row" style="text-align:center" | 2020
| 
| 26 || 7 || 3 || 3 || 52 || 44 || 96 || 14 || 36 || 0.4 || 0.4 || 7.4 || 6.3 || 13.7 || 2.0 || 5.1 || 
|- class="sortbottom"
! colspan=3 | Career
! 7
! 3 
! 3
! 52
! 44 
! 96 
! 14 
! 36 
! 0.4
! 0.4 
! 7.4
! 6.3 
! 13.7 
! 2.0 
! 5.1
! 
|}

References

External links 

1991 births
Living people
Port Adelaide Football Club (AFLW) players
Gold Coast Football Club (AFLW) players
Geelong Football Club (AFLW) players
Australian rules footballers from Queensland